Trigoniulidae, is a family of round-backed millipedes of the order Spirobolida. The family includes 171 species belongs to 25 genera.

Genera
 
Acanthiulus
Ainigmabolus
Apeuthes
Cairibolus
Chersastus
Cingalobolus
Decelus
Epombrophilus
Eucarlia
Lankabolus
Leptogoniulus
Litobolus
Marshallbolus
Phagostrophus
Plokamostrophus
Prionopeza
Speleostrophus
Spirostrophus
Sympastrophus
Thrinciulus
Trigoniulus
Trucobolus
Variulus
Zygostrophus

References

Spirobolida
Millipede families